Artashar is a village in the Armavir Province of Armenia. Today, almost 42% (around 511 individuals) of the population are Yazidis.

References

External links 

Report of the results of the 2001 Armenian Census

Populated places in Armavir Province
Yazidi villages